The year 1654 in science and technology involved some significant events.

Astronomy
 Sicilian astronomer Giovanni Battista Hodierna publishes De systemate orbis cometici, deque admirandis coeli characteribus including a catalog of comets and nebulae.

Mathematics
 At the prompting of the Chevalier de Méré, Blaise Pascal corresponds with Pierre de Fermat on gambling problems, from which is born the theory of probability.

Physics
 May 8 – Otto von Guericke demonstrates the effectiveness of his vacuum pump and the power of atmospheric pressure using the Magdeburg hemispheres before Ferdinand III, Holy Roman Emperor, in Regensburg.

Births
 December 27 – Jakob Bernoulli, Swiss mathematician (died 1705).
 John Banister, English missionary and botanist (died 1692).
 prob. date – Eleanor Glanville, English entomologist (died 1709).

Deaths
 August 31 – Ole Worm, Danish physician, natural historian and antiquary (born 1588)
 October 18 – Nicholas Culpeper, English herbalist (born 1616)
 Giovanni de Galliano Pieroni, Italian military engineer and astronomer (born 1586)

References

 
17th century in science
1650s in science